Noyan may refer to one of the following.

 Noyan, Quebec, Canada
 Noyan, a title of authority in Central Asia, including:
 Baiju Noyan (died 1260), Mongolian Commander.
 Baycu Noyan (fictional character), a character in Diriliş: Ertuğrul based on Baiju Noyan.
 Chormaqan Noyan, or Chormagan Noyan, (died 1241), Mongolian General.
 Jebei Noyan, or Jebe or Chepe Noyan, (died 1225), Mongolian General.
 Kitbuqa Noyan (died 1260), Mongolian soldier.
 Engin Noyan, Turkish musician.
 Abbas Noyan, Afghanistani Politician.

See also 
 Noyon, Oise, France